The following are the appointments to various Canadian Honours of 2008. Usually, they are announced as part of the New Year and Canada Day celebrations and are published within the Canada Gazette during the year. This follows the custom set out within the United Kingdom which publishes its appoints of various British Honours for New Year's and for monarch's official birthday. However, instead of the midyear appointments announced on Victoria Day, the official birthday of the Canadian Monarch, this custom has been transferred with the celebration of Canadian Confederation and the creation of the Order of Canada.

However, as the Canada Gazette publishes appointment to various orders, decorations and medal, either Canadian or from Commonwealth and foreign states, this article will reference all Canadians so honoured during the 2008 calendar year.

Provincial Honours are not listed within the Canada Gazette. However, they are listed here.

The Order of Canada

Companion of the Order of Canada

 The Right Honourable Joseph Jacques Jean Chrétien, PC, CC, QC
 Prudy Crawford, CC - This is a promotion within the Order 
 The Honourable Barnett J. Danson, PC, CC - This is a promotion within the Order 
 Rock Demers, CC - This is a promotion within the Order 
 The Honourable Charles D. Gonthier, CC
 The Honourable Frank Iacobucci, CC
 Preston Manning, CC
 The Honourable Louise Arbour, CC
 Michael Snow, CC - This is a promotion within the Order 
 Margaret E. Southern, CC, LVO, AEO - This is a promotion within the Order
 The Right Honourable Kim Campbell, P.C., C.C.
 The Honourable John C. Major, C.C.
 G. Wallace F. McCain, C.C., O.N.B. - This is a promotion within the Order 
 Raymond Moriyama, C.C., O.Ont. - This is a promotion within the Order
 Marcel Trudel, C.C., G.O.Q. - This is a promotion within the Order

Honorary Officers of the Order of Canada
 Charles Aznavour, O.C.
 Bernard Pivot, O.C.

Officer of the Order of Canada

 Bertha Clark, OC
 Tom Cochrane, OC
 Paul Corkum, OC
 The Honourable William Hoyt, OC
 Molly Johnson, OC
 Leon Katz, OC, O.Ont
 Edward A. Lyons, OC
 Michael Maclear, OC
 Alistair MacLeod, OC
 Carolyn McAskie, OC
 Derek Oland, OC
 Miles Richardson, OC 
 Robbie Robertson, OC 
 Ginette Lemire Rodger, OC 
 Jane Stewart, OC 
 Pamela Wallin, OC, SOM
 Kenny Wheeler, OC 
 Marie Chiouinard, OC 
 David A. Dodge, OC 
 Richard L. (Rick) George, OC
 Deborah Grey, OC
 Clara Hughes, OC, O.Man
 Douglas Gordon Jones, OC
 The Honourable E. Leo Kolber, OC
 Donat Lacroix, OC
 Jean Lemire, OC
 Joanne MacDonald, OC, ONL
 Grant Munro, OC 
 Stephen Nash, OC, OBC
 Alex Neve, OC
 Adrianne Pieczonka, OC 
 Richard Puddephatt, OC 
 Muriel Smith, OC 
 Steven Staryk, OC 
 Lawrence M. Tanebaum, OC 
 Jeff Wall, OC
 Jocelyne Alloucherie, O.C.
 Gail Asper, O.C., O.M.
 Randolph C. (Randy) Bachman, O.C., O.M.
 Robin W. Boadway, O.C.
 Raymond Breton, O.C.
 AA Bronson, O.C.
 Victor S. Buffalo, O.C., A.O.E.
 Maria Campbell, O.C., S.O.M.
 Joan Clark, O.C.
 George Elliott Clarke, O.C., O.N.S.
 Jean-Marie Dufour, O.C., O.Q.
 Basil (Buzz) Hargrove, O.C.
 Martha Jodrey, O.C.
 The Honourable Donald J. Johnston, P.C., O.C.
 Victor Ling, O.C., O.B.C.
 Peter Mansbridge, O.C.
 Allan P. Markin, O.C.
 Piers McDonald, O.C.
 The Honourable Frank McKenna, P.C., O.C., O.N.B.
 Timothy R. Oke, O.C.
 The Honourable Landon Pearson, O.C.
 Clayton H. Riddell, O.C.
 John N. Smith, O.C.
 David Sweet, O.C.
 Audrey Thomas, O.C.
 Paul Thompson, O.C.

Members of the Order of Canada

 Jean-Baptiste (John) Arcand, C.M.
 Chrystine Brouillet, C.M.
 Elizabeth (Libby) Burnham, C.M.
 Jean C. Chiasson, C.M.
 Joan Craig, C.M.
 Alexander (Al) Davidson, C.M.
 Mary Dawson, C.M.
 Flora M. Dell, C.M.
 Robert Doyle, C.M.
 Maria K. Eriksen, C.M.
 John Fanning, C.M.
 Bunny Ferguson, C.M.
 William Fitzgerald, C.M.
 J. Barry French, C.M.
 Ronald Gillespie, C.M.
 Terrence Gillespie, C.M.
 Muriel Gold, C.M.
 Charlotte Gray, C.M.
 Doreen Hall, C.M.
 Robert H. A. Haslam, C.M.
 The Honourable Lynda Haverstock, C.M., S.O.M.
 The Reverend Dr. Brent Hawkes, C.M.
 Peter A. Howlett, C.M.
 Beryl Ivey, C.M.
 Zbigniew Kabata, C.M.
 Laurent Lapierre, C.M.
 Ronald Edward Lawless, C.M.
 Jon Lien, C.M.
 P. Ann MacCuspie, C.M.
 Douglas MacPhee, C.M.
 Robert R. McEwen, C.M.
 Thomas W. Noseworthy, C.M.
 Elizabeth Parr-Johnston, C.M.
 Jean E. Portugal, C.M.
 Lola Rasminsky, C.M.
 Donald B. Rix, C.M., O.B.C.
 Leon Rooke, C.M.
 Kent Stetson, C.M.
 Jeffrey Turnbull, C.M.
 Jim Vallance, C.M.
 H. P. Daniel (Sandy) Van Ginkel, C.M.
 Timothy Vernon, C.M.
 Frederick A. (Fred) Walsh, C.M.
 Michael R. Weir, C.M., O.Ont.
 Howard White, C.M., O.B.C.
 Wilfrid Wilkinson, C.M.
 Clara Will, C.M.
 Garry W. Anderson, C.M.
 Tony Aspler, C.M.
 Peter Aucoin, C.M.
 Larry Audlaluk, C.M.
 John Barron, C.M.
 Margaret Becklake, C.M.
 Carol Gay Bell, C.M., S.O.M.
 Hélène-Andrée Bizier, C.M.
 Thea Borlase, C.M.
 Peter G. Buckland, C.M.
 Michael Clague, C.M.
 Armand de Mestral, C.M.
 Marcien Ferland, C.M.
 Mallory Gilbert, C.M.
 Frieda Granot, C.M.
 Walter Gretzky, C.M., O.Ont.
 Valerie Hussey, C.M.
 John E. (Jack) Irving, C.M.
 Antoine Landry, C.M.
 The Honourable Patrick LeSage, C.M.
 Karen Letofsky, C.M.
 The Honourable René J. Marin, C.M., O.M.M., O.Ont., C.D.
 Richard Parsons (Dick) North, C.M.
 Patricia O’Connor, C.M.
 Irene E. Pfeiffer, C.M.
 Kenneth Poyser, C.M.
 Derek A. Price, C.M.
 Bruce Pullan, C.M.
 Ray V. Rajotte, C.M., A.O.E., M.S.M.
 Joseph Schatzker, C.M.
 Michael D. Scott, C.M.
 Yoshio Senda, C.M.
 Paul Shaffer, C.M.
 Douglas A. Smith, C.M.
 Sister Margaret Smith, C.M.
 Jeffrey Spalding, C.M.
 T. Kenneth Thorlakson, C.M.
 Sister Margaret Vickers, C.M.
 Anne H. Wieler, C.M.
 Richard B. Wright, C.M.
 Gordon E. Arnell, C.M.
 Constance Backhouse, C.M.
 Lyle R. Best, C.M.
 Paul Bley, C.M.
 Peter Boneham, C.M.
 Yvette Bonny, C.M., C.Q.
 Jeanne-d’Arc Bouchard, C.M., C.Q.
 Robert E. Brown, C.M., O.Q.
 Judith Chernin Budovitch, C.M.
 Dominic Champagne, C.M.
 Simon Chang, C.M.
 Marcel A. Desautels, C.M.
 The Honourable Myra A. Freeman, C.M., O.N.S.
 Robert G. Glossop, C.M.
 Vladimir Hachinski, C.M.
 Dezso J. Horvath, C.M. 
 Elke Inkster, C.M.
 Tim Inkster, C.M.
 Patrick J. Keenan, C.M., O.Ont.
 Marc Kielburger, C.M.
 Rudolph J. Kriegler, C.M.
 Norman Levine, C.M.
 Christine Leyser, C.M.
 H. Wade MacLauchlan, C.M.
 R. Gordon M. Macpherson, C.M.
 Mick Mallon, C.M.
 Judith Mappin, C.M.
 Michael R. Marrus, C.M.
 Ian W. McDougall, C.M.
 Axel Meisen, C.M.
 Henry Morgentaler, C.M.
 Philip Walter Owen, C.M.
 André Poilièvre, C.M.
 The Honourable Brenda Robertson, C.M., O.N.B.
 Kenneth Charles Sauer, C.M., C.D.
 Bernard Savoie, C.M.
 Reginald Lorne Scott, C.M.
 T. Clayton Shields, C.M.
 John S. Speakman, C.M.
 James C. Temerty, C.M.
 José Verstappen, C.M.
 Henry H. Wakabayashi, C.M., O.B.C.
 George A. Zarb, C.M.

Order of Military Merit

Commanders of the Order of Military Merit

 Major-General D. W. Langton, C.D. 
 Lieutenant-General Andrew Brooke Leslie, M.S.C., M.S.M., C.D. - This is a promotion within the Order
 Major-General J. G. M. Lessard, C.D.
 Rear-Admiral Tyrone H. W. Pile, C.D. 
 Vice-Admiral Drew William Robertson, M.S.M., C.D. - This is a promotion within the Order
 Major-General W. Angus Watt, C.D. - This is a promotion within the Order
 Major-General S. A. Beare, C.M.M., M.S.M., C.D.
 Major-General D. J. R. S. Benjamin, C.M.M., C.D. - This is a promotion within the Order
 Major-General J. M. Duval, C.M.M., C.D 
 Major-General J. P. Y. D. Gosselin, C.M.M., C.D. - This is a promotion within the Order
 Rear-Admiral P. D. McFadden, C.M.M., C.D. 
 Rear-Admiral B. M. Weadon, C.M.M., C.D

Officers of the Order of Military Merit

 Colonel Jonathan Keith Ambler, C.D. 
 Colonel Yvan Joseph Aime Jean Blondin, C.D. 
 Commander David Ross Garbutt Brown, C.D. 
 Colonel R. K. (Ken) Chadder, C.D. 
 Major Frances Louise Chilton-Mackay, C.D. 
 Major Frederick Wayne Cyr, C.D. 
 Lieutenant-Colonel Joseph Paul de Boucherville Taillon, C.D. 
 Lieutenant-Colonel Brigid White Dooley-Tremblay, C.D. 
 Lieutenant-Colonel Richard Bruce Fawcett, C.D. 
 Captain(N) David Christopher Gardam, C.D. 
 Major Lloyd William Arthur Gillam, C.D. 
 Captain(N) Laurence M. Hickey, C.D. 
 Colonel Douglas Craig Hilton, C.D. 
 Colonel Joseph Jacques Aubert Lachance, C.D. 
 Colonel Joseph Rene Marcel Guy Laroche, C.D. 
 Colonel Tom James Lawson, C.D. 
 Major J. M. A. Levesque, C.D. 
 Captain(N) Paul Andrew Maddison, C.D. 
 Commander John Frederick Newton, C.D. 
 Lieutenant-Colonel Paul Ormsby, C.D. 
 Lieutenant-Colonel Jean-Pierre Pichette, C.D. 
 Major Lee-Anne Quinn, C.D. 
 Commander John Allen Roche, C.D. 
 Lieutenant-Colonel Stéphane Roy, C.D. 
 Colonel Clyde Thomas Russell, C.D. 
 Colonel Grant Yorkland Smith, C.D. 
 Colonel Gary Reginald Stafford, C.D. 
 Lieutenant-Colonel Edward Emil Staniowski, C.D. 
 Colonel Denis Thompson, C.D. 
 Captain(N) Kelly Edward Williams, M.S.M., C.D. 
 Colonel Paul Francis Wynnyk, C.D. 
 Colonel Lorne David Zens, C.D.
 Lieutenant-Colonel Susan Beharriell, O.M.M., C.D. 
 Captain (N) S. C. Bertrand, O.M.M, C.D. 
 Colonel D. C. Burt, O.M.M., C.D.
 Lieutenant-Colonel S. M. Carey, O.M.M., C.D. 
 Colonel G. J. A. Champagne, O.M.M., C.D. 
 Lieutenant-Colonel B. A. J. Ciarroni, O.M.M., C.D. 
 Commander D. J. M. Daigneault, O.M.M., C.D. 
 Colonel J. R. Ferron, O.M.M., C.D. 
 Lieutenant-Colonel M. J. P. Fortin, O.M.M., C.D. 
 Lieutenant-Colonel P. F. C. Garbutt, O.M.M., C.D. 
 Lieutenant-Colonel W. H. Garrick, O.M.M., C.D. 
 Colonel L. G. Gillis, O.M.M., C.D. 
 Commander M. J. M. Hallé, O.M.M., C.D 
 Lieutenant-Colonel J. W. Hammond, O.M.M., C.D. 
 Major D. L. Harper, O.M.M., C.D. 
 Captain (N) H. T. Harsch, O.M.M., C.D. 
 Captain (N) G. H. A. Hatton, O.M.M., C.D. 
 Captain (N) N. H. Jolin, O.M.M., C.D. 
 Commander R. W. Jones, O.M.M., C.D. 
 Lieutenant-Colonel P. E. Kearney, O.M.M., C.D. 
 Lieutenant-Colonel T. W. Kopan, O.M.M., M.O.M., C.D. 
 Lieutenant-Colonel J. N. Lalonde, O.M.M., C.D. 
 Lieutenant-Colonel R. S. Martinell, O.M.M., C.D. 
 Lieutenant-Colonel D. A. Mason, O.M.M., C.D. 
 Lieutenant-Colonel D. L. Miller, O.M.M., C.D. 
 Colonel D. G. Neasmith, O.M.M., C.D. 
 Colonel A. C. Patch, O.M.M., C.D. 
 Lieutenant-Colonel R. J. Powell, O.M.M., C.D. 
 Colonel J. B. Roeterink, O.M.M., C.D. 
 Lieutenant-Colonel D. A. Rundle, O.M.M., C.D. 
 Colonel J. G. G. Simard, O.M.M., C.D. 
 Captain (N) W. S. Truelove, O.M.M., C. D.

Members of the Order of Military Merit

 Petty Officer 1st Class Jean Joseph Gabriel Adrien Allard, C.D. 
 Chief Petty Officer 2nd Class Muriel Marie Jeanne Arsenault, C.D. 
 Chief Warrant Officer Joseph Théophile Richard Bégin, C.D. 
 Chief Warrant Officer Jean Boivin, C.D. 
 Warrant Officer Andre Joseph Luc Bouchard, C.D. 
 Captain Jacques Albert Gaetan Joseph Bouchard, C.D. 
 Captain Martin Lewis Brown, C.D. 
 Master Warrant Officer John Gerald Bucci, C.D. 
 Master Warrant Officer James Donald Butters, C.D. 
 Lieutenant(N) Robert Francis Cyril Campbell, C.D.
 Chief Warrant Officer Kevin Ernest Carleton, C.D. 
 Chief Warrant Officer J. René Caron, C.D. 
 Chief Warrant Officer Marjolaine Marie Caron, C.D. 
 Master Warrant Officer Joseph Maurice Gabriel Chartier, C.D. 
 Chief Warrant Officer Henry Jacob Chartrand, C.D. 
 Chief Petty Officer 1st Class Barbara Jean Corbett, C.D. 
 Chief Warrant Officer Marc Joseph Corbin, C.D. 
 Chief Petty Officer 1st Class Richard (Rick) James Devlieger, C.D. 
 Warrant Officer Michael Richard Dickerson, C.D. 
 Chief Warrant Officer Garfield (Gary) Augustine Foley, C.D. 
 Master Warrant Officer Toni Kendall Gilks, C.D. 
 Master Warrant Officer Joseph Laurent Daniel Giroux, C.D. 
 Captain Brian John Greenwood, C.D. 
 Chief Warrant Officer Kent John Griffiths, C.D. 
 Master Warrant Officer Geoffrey Ernest Hanson, C.D. 
 Master Warrant Officer David Charles Herman, C.D. 
 Master Warrant Officer Donald Bruce Hodge, C.D. 
 Chief Warrant Officer Lloyd Robert Hodgins, C.D. 
 Chief Warrant Officer Michael Robert Eldon Hornbrook, C.D. 
 Warrant Officer Marilyn Barbara Hynes, C.D 
 Chief Petty Officer 1st Class Normand Fernand Joseph Laliberté, C.D.
 Chief Warrant Officer Joseph Robert Yves Lefebvre, C.D. 
 Sergeant Susan Marie Lloyd, C.D. 
 Chief Warrant Officer Dino Luberti, C.D. 
 Chief Warrant Officer Kevin Mason, C.D. 
 Master Warrant Officer A. Gerard McGee, C.D. 
 Master Warrant Officer Todd Alan McGowan, C.D.
 Chief Warrant Officer Raymond Anthony McInnis, C.D. 
 Chief Petty Officer 1st Class Dennis Rae McMillan, C.D. 
 Chief Warrant Officer J. H. Bernard McNicoll, C.D. 
 Master Warrant Officer Robert Joseph Montague, C.D. 
 Captain William David Moore, C.D. 
 Master Warrant Officer Leonard Paul O’Brien, C.D. 
 Chief Warrant Officer Kevin Douglas O’Rourke, C.D.
 Master Warrant Officer John Paul Michael Parsons, C.D. 
 Master Warrant Officer Jocelyn Elaine Pemberton, C.D. 
 Chief Warrant Officer J. G. Gilbert Poirier, C.D. 
 Master Warrant Officer Timothy Patrick Power, C.D. 
 Chief Warrant Officer Kenneth Lauder Rerrie, C.D. 
 Master Warrant Officer Terrence Lincoln Riddle, C.D. 
 Master Warrant Officer Marc-André Ross, C.D. 
 Master Warrant Officer Yves Roy, C.D. 
 Chief Warrant Officer Bruno Joseph Ernest Savard, C.D. 
 Chief Warrant Officer Craig Albert Schrader, C.D. 
 Petty Officer 1st Class William Edward Slater, C.D. 
 Master Warrant Officer Susan Bertha Stark, C.D. 
 Chief Warrant Officer Pierre Ste-Marie, C.D.
 Lieutenant W. J. Anderson, M.M.M., C.D. 
 Chief Warrant Officer M. L. Baisley, M.M.M., C.D 
 Chief Warrant Officer C. J. Barth, M.M.M., C.D 
 Chief Warrant Officer J. R. S. Beaudoin, M.M.M., C.D. 
 Master Warrant Officer B. R. J. Beek, M.M.M., C.D. 
 Chief Warrant Officer A. J. W. Begg, M.M.M., C.D. 
 Chief Warrant Officer J. M. A. Brideau, M.M.M., C.D. 
 Captain T. D. Brodie, M. M. M., C.D. 
 Master Warrant Officer J. J. R. Butler, M.M.M., M.S.M., C.D. 
 Master Warrant Officer M. Cantin, M.M.M., C.D. 
 Chief Warrant Officer J. Y. P. Cassavant, M.M.M., C.D. 
 Warrant Officer R. C. Cosens, M.M.M., C.D. 
 Chief Warrant Officer J. G. P. Côté, M.M.M., C.D. 
 Warrant Officer M. N. M. Cowperthwaite, M.M.M., C.D.
 Warrant Officer R. R. G. Cranford, M.M.M., C.D. 
 Master Warrant Officer A. M. Cromwell, M.M.M., C.D. 
 Warrant Officer M. C. D. L. Deshaies, M.M.M., C.D. 
 Master Warrant Officer J. M. Doppler, M.M.M., C.D. 
 Chief Petty Officer 1st Class H. W. Fancy, M.M.M., C.D. 
 Sergeant T. A. Flath, M.M.M., C.D. 
 Chief Warrant Officer G. K. Gagawchuk, M.M.M., C.D. 
 Chief Warrant Officer J. A. Guimond, M.M.M., C.D. 
 Petty Officer 2nd Class J. P. Haas, M.M.M., C.D. 
 Chief Petty Officer 1st Class P. M. Hagan, M.M.M., C.D. L
 Chief Petty Officer 2nd Class T. E. Harwood-Jones, M.M.M., C.D.
 Chief Warrant Officer J. K. Hohmann, M.M.M., C.D. 
 Master Warrant Officer T. A. Innes, M.M.M., C.D. 
 Private O. Ittinuar, M. M. M., C.D. 
 Chief Warrant Officer G. J. R. P. Janssens, M.M.M., C.D. 
 Petty Officer 1st Class S. W. Jeffery, M.M.M., C.D. 
 Lieutenant (N) P. M. A. Jessup, M.M.M., C.D. 
 Chief Warrant Officer K. P. Jones, M.M.M., C.D. 
 Chief Warrant Officer K. R. Junor, M.M.M., C.D. 
 Master Warrant Officer L. T. King, M.M.M., C.D. 
 Chief Warrant Officer C. J. E. Kitching, M.M.M., C.D. 
 Warrant Officer J. G. Lamarre, M.M.M., C.D. 
 Chief Petty Officer 1st Class J. A. C. Laurendeau, M.M.M., C.D. 
 Petty Officer 1st Class J. A. Llewellen, M.M.M., C.D. 
 Captain B. E. Maddin, M.M.M., C.D. 
 Chief Petty Officer 1st Class D. A. Markin, M.M.M., C.D. 
 Warrant Officer D. G. Marshall, M.M.M., C.D. 
 Chief Warrant Officer J. J. G. Martin, M.M.M., C.D. 
 Chief Warrant Officer D. J. Mazerolle, M.M.M., C.D. 
 Sergeant C. A. McLean, M.M.M., C.D. 
 Sergeant R. H. Mitchell, M.M.M., C.D. 
 Chief Petty Officer 1st Class M. E. Moger, M.M.M., C.D. 
 Chief Warrant Officer G. W. F. Morrison, M.M.M., C.D. 
 Chief Petty Officer 2nd Class J. F. Murphy, M.M.M., C.D. 
 Chief Warrant Officer J. E. O. Myers, M.M.M., C.D. 
 Chief Warrant Officer B. G. Paradis, M.M.M., C.D. 
 Chief Warrant Officer J. B. J. P. Pépin, M.M.M., C.D. 
 Master Warrant Officer J. W. Peterson, M.M.M., C.D. 
 Master Warrant Officer J. H. Pineault, M.M.M., C.D. 
 Master Warrant Officer A. Renaud, M.M.M., C.D. 
 Chief Warrant Officer J. E. R. Riopel, M.M.M., C.D. 
 Master Warrant Officer T. G. Roberts, M.M.M., C.D. 
 Captain R. J. A. Robillard, M.M.M., C.D. 
 Chief Petty Officer 2nd Class A. B. Robinson, M.M.M., C.D. 
 Captain T. J. E. Robinson, M.M.M., C.D .
 Chief Warrant Officer J. M. Y. Rochon, M.M.M., C.D. 
 Chief Warrant Officer J. L. Scheidl, M.M.M., C.D. 
 Chief Petty Officer 2nd Class M. P. Simonsen, M.M.M., C.D. 
 Master Warrant Officer G. J. M. Tanney, M.M.M., C.D. 
 Major G. W. A. Thorne, M.M.M., C.D. 
 Chief Warrant Officer D. V. Tibbel, M.M.M., C.D. 
 Captain R. Van den Berg, M.M.M., C.D 
 Master Warrant Officer M. P. Webb, M.M.M., C.D. 
 Chief Warrant Officer C. A. White, M.M.M., C.D.

Order of Merit of the Police Forces

Commanders of the Order of Merit of the Police Forces

 Detective Sergeant Tony Cannavino
 Chief Jack Ewatski, C.O.M. Chef Jack Ewatski, C.O.M.
 Chief Edgar A. MacLeod, C.O.M. - This is a promotion within the Order

Officers of the Order of Merit of the Police Forces

 Chief William Sterling Blair
 Assistant Director Diane Bourdeau
 Deputy Chief Constable James S. Chu
 Chief William J. Closs
 Assistant Commissioner Sandra Mae Marie Conlin
 Constable Jean-Guy Dagenais
 Director Yvan Delorme
 Assistant Director Jean-Guy Gagnon
 Assistant Commissioner Howard Darrell Martin Madill
 Assistant Commissioner Michael F. McDonell
 Chief Superintendent Randy Starrett Robar
 Deputy Chief Anthony John Warr
 Deputy Chief Clive L. Weighill
 Senior Director Eldon Amoroso, O.O.M. 
 Chief Jack H. Beaton, O.O.M. 
 Deputy Chief Kim Walter Derry, O.O.M. 
 Chief Constable Derek C. Egan, O.O.M., C.D. 
 Assistant Director General Régis Falardeau, O.O.M. 
 Chief Wm. Murray Faulkner, O.O.M. 
 Assistant Commissioner Peter M. German, O.O.M. 
 Assistant Commissioner Darrell John LaFosse, O.O.M., L.V.O. 
 Superintendent Gordon Blake Schumacher, O.O.M. 
 Assistant Commissioner Joseph Donat Michel Seguin, O.O.M. 
 Assistant Commissioner Raf Souccar, O.O.M.

Members of the Order of Merit of the Police Forces

 Inspector Donald John Adam
 Sergeant Brenton Robert Baulkham
 Corporal Michel Bérubé
 Chief Allen G. Bodechon
 Chief Joseph F. Browne
 Inspector Myles F. Burke
 Assistant Director Yves Charette
 Corporal Thomas David Clark
 Constable Edward P. Conway
 Chief Ian Davidson
 Superintendent P. J. Keith Duggan
 Constable Ralph E. Edwards
 Sergeant Major Robert Gordon James Gallup
 Staff Sergeant Warren L. Games
 Staff Superintendent Richard J. Gauthier
 Staff Superintendent Gary Frank Grant
 Staff Sergeant Sylvio Alfred Gravel
 Inspector Charles Patrick Green
 Deputy Chief Troy C. Hagen
 Deputy Chief Bruce Kenneth Herridge
 Deputy Chief D. Eric Jolliffe
 Staff Sergeant Kathleen Ann King
 Detective Sergeant Derrick John Klassen
 Inspector Terry Wayne Kopan
 Constable Claude Larocque
 Louise Christina Logue
 Chief Superintendent Patrick F. McCloskey
 Superintendent Gordon Christopher McRae
 Staff Sergeant Robert Wayne Meredith
 Detective Sergeant Kenneth S. Molloy
 Sergeant Hugh Robert Muir
 Chief Brian Mullan
 Staff Sergeant Lawren Andrew Nause
 Inspector Brian Robert Pitman
 Sergeant Deborah June Pond
 Constable Lesley-Jane Ripley
 Glenwood L. Selig
 Chief Lorne W. Smith
 Staff Sergeant David Raymond Tipple
 Inspector Robert John Williams
 Inspector David Gerard Wojcik
 Chief Constable Walter Lorne Zapotichny
 Corporal Stewart Richard Angus, M.O.M.
 Corporal Terrence Barter, M.O.M. 
 Sergeant James Raymond Baskin, M.O.M. 
 Chief Superintendent Ross A. Bingley, M.O.M. 
 Sergeant Major Randall Kent Burt, M.O.M. 
 Superintendent Kenneth Cenzura, M.O.M. 
 Superintendent Robert James Chapman, M.M.M., M.O.M., C.D. 
 Director Serge Daoust, M.O.M. 
 Chief Bruce J. Davis, M.O.M. 
 Deputy Chief Jane Elizabeth Dick, M.O.M. 
 Deputy Chief Bradley S. Duncan, M.O.M. 
 Assistant Director General Denis Fiset, M.O.M. 
 Deputy Chief Keith Livingstone Forde, M.O.M. 
 Constable Robert Gagnon, M.O.M. 
 Inspector John E. G. Grant, M.O.M. 
 Chief Superintendent William B. Grodzinski, M.O.M. 
 Sergeant Bradley Thomas Hampson, M.O.M. 
 Chief Superintendent Barry Harvie, M.O.M. 
 Inspector Shawn W. Hayes, M.O.M. 
 Staff Sergeant Kenneth J. Hykawy, M.O.M. 
 Chief Richard Laperriere, M.O.M. 
 Staff Sergeant Gary John Le Gresley, M.O.M. 
 Deputy Chief Constable Douglas A. LePard, M.O.M. 
 Chief Glenn M. Lickers, M.O.M. 
 Sergeant Douglas James Lockhart, M.O.M. 
 Sergeant Gordon Bruce Magee, M.O.M. 
 Chief Superintendent Norman Georges Mazerolle, M.O.M. 
 Chief Gerald William McEwin, M.O.M. 
 Chief Dale R. McFee, M.O.M. 
 Staff Sergeant David Frederick McIntyre, M.O.M. 
 Deputy Chief Charles David Mercier, M.O.M. 
 Sergeant Sharon Meredith, M.O.M. 
 Inspector Gervais Ouellet, M.O.M. 
 Chief Superintendent Randall Ross Parks, M.O.M. 
 Deputy Chief Constable Clayton J. D. Pecknold, M.O.M. 
 Deputy Chief Constable Robert A. Rich, M.O.M. 
 Superintendent Wayne Eric Rideout, M.O.M. 
 Sergeant Robert A. Ruiters, M.O.M. 
 Chief Constable Paul J. Shrive, M.O.M. 
 Staff Sergeant Francis Ronald Stevenson, M.O.M. 
 Constable Pierre Thébault, M.O.M. 
 Georges D. Thériault, M.O.M.
 Chief Paul Russell Trivett, M.O.M. 
 Associate Chief David D. Wilson, M.O.M.

Most Venerable Order of the Hospital of St. John of Jerusalem

Knights and Dames of the Order of St. John
 The Honourable David Charles Onley, O.Ont.
 The Honourable Steven L. Point
 Agnes Daniell, ADC
 Claude Gagnon

Commanders of the Order of St. John
 Debra E. Allcock
 Robert M. Boyko
 Major Roman John Ciecwierz, C.D.
 Captain  William Gary Cullum, C.D., (Retired)
 Colonel Leslie Keith Deane, C.D.
 Luc Desmarais
 Lawrence R. Hardy

Officers of the Order of St. John
 Her Honour Ruth Ann Onley
 Her Honour Gwendolyn Point
 Joseph-Hyacinthe Breton
 Alexandra Carter
 Donna Christine Chandler
 Lise Dutrisac-Dillabough
 Reginald T. Erickson
 Commissioner Julian Fantino, C.O.M., O.Ont.
 Henry X. Geldart
 William W. Green, C.D.
 Melvin George Hazlewood
 Chief Petty Officer 2nd Class Charles Evert Hurst, C.D.
 Kit-Yee Lo, Scarborough
 Alan C. McBride
 Claudine Morisseau

Members of the Order of St. John
 Harry Abbink
 Robyn Ashby
 Brian G. C. Attfield
 Captaine Peter Beatty
 Lucie Bhérer
 Daniel Arthur Birkenbergs
 Alan Thomas Blundell
 Christopher Bolestrisge,
 Deputy ChiefTerence Edward Peter
 Lieutenant-Commander Ernest Joseph Bremner, C.D.
 Major Kenneth Wade Bridges
 Jennifer M. Carty
 Laurence Cheng
 Sergeant Bohdan Cherniawski
 Christopher Cheung
 Mark S. Conliffe
 ChiefPeter Corfield
 Robert Côté
 Todd Eric Harwood-Jones
 Kate Thurston Heron
 Audrey F. Hill
 Michael James Hill
 Edward David Hodgins
 Dany Houde
 Dominic Jobin-Cotnoir
 Audrey Helen Jones
 Janice Marjorie Kivimaki
 Audrey Lalonde
 Pierre Laplante
 Jean-Phillippe Lebel
 Captain Francis Lévesque
 Sub-lieutenant Sean Edward Livingston
 Corporal Graham Carl MacRae
 Daniel Michaud
 Ian Hugh Miller 
 Laurie Ann Molnar
 Tara Morgan
 Captain Craig Michael Murray, C.D.
 Bradley A. Nastiuk
 Lieutenant(N) Brenda Louise Nelson, ADC
 Susanne Clara Maria Olver
 Renee Anthony Ongcango

Provincial Honours

National Order of Québec

Grand Officers of the National Order of Québec

 The Honourable Lucien Bouchard, PC, GOQ
 Robert Bourassa, GOQ
 Leonard Cohen, CC, GOQ
 Alban D’Amours, GOQ
 Daniel Johnson (Fils), GOQ
 Dr. Pierre Marc Johnson, GOQ, MD
 Bernard Landry, GOQ
 René Lévesque, GOQ
 Dr. Jacques Parizeau, GOQ, PH.D

Officers of the National Order of Québec

 André Bachand, CM, OQ
 Gérald-A. Beaudoin, OC, OQ
 Michel G. Bergeron, OQ
 Pierre Bruneau, OQ
 André Caillé, OQ
 Robert Charlebois, OQ
 Francine Décary, OQ
 Clément Duhaime, OQ
 Louis Fortier, OC, OQ
 Pavel Hamet, OQ
 Pierre Lassonde, CM, OQ
 Gilles Marcotte, CM, OQ
 Rémi Marcoux, CM, OQ
 Anne Claire Poirier, OC, OQ
 Mohamad Sawan, OQ
 Michèle Stanton-Jean, OQ
 Ashok K. Vijh, OC, OQ

Knight of the National Order of Québec

 Silvia Araya, CQ
 Antoine Ayoub, CM, CQ
 Georgette Beaudry, CQ
 Françoise Bertrand, CQ
 Gilles Bissonnette, CQ
 Émile Bouchard, CQ
 Raymond Brousseau, CQ
 Louis Caron, CQ
 Jacques Castonguay, CM, CQ
 François Chartier, CQ
 René Derouin, CQ
 Jacques Duchesneau, CM, CQ
 The Honourable Marisa Ferretti Barth, CQ
 Sheila Fischman, CM, CQ
 Dr. Pierre Fréchette, CQ
 Edgar Fruitier, CQ
 Sheila Goldbloom, CM, CQ
 Gisèle Gravel, CQ
 Henri Grondin, CQ
 Gloria Jeliu, CM, CQ
 Aida Kamar, CQ
 Nicolas Mateesco Matte, CM, CQ, FRSC
 Paul-Arthur Mckenzie, CQ
 Michel Pouliot, CQ
 Normand Séguin, CQ
 Peter Simons, CQ
 E. Noël Spinelli, CM, CQ
 Richard Tremblay, CQ
 Elena Venditelli Faita, CQ
 Yanick Villedieu, CQ

Saskatchewan Order of Merit

 The Honourable Edward D. Bayda, S.O.M., Q.C., LL.D. (1931‐2010)
 Dr. Eli Bornstein, S.O.M.
 Dr. Elizabeth Brewster, C.M., S.O.M. (1922‐2012)
 Elder Antoine (Tony) E. Cote, S.O.M.
 L. Irene Dubé, S.O.M., LL.D.
 Leslie D. Dubé, S.O.M., LL.D.
 Bob Ellard, S.O.M.
 Gavin Semple, S.O.M.

Order of Ontario

 Dr. Michael Baker
 Dr. Sheela Basrur 
George Brady
Jack Chiang – journalist, community service
Tony Dean 
Mary Dickson 
Noel Edison 
Frank Fernandes 
Jean-Robert Gauthier 
Sam George
Heather Gibson 
Robert A. Gordon 
Gordon Gray 
Susan Hoeg 
Claude Lamoureux
Patrick Le Sage
Dr. Joe MacInnis 
Dr. David MacLennan
Lorna Marsden 
David Peterson 
Ed Ratushny 
Rosemary Sadlier 
 Dr. Fuad Sahin 
Barbara Ann Scott-King 
Ellen Seligman 
Peter Silverman 
David Smith 
Ted Szilva 
Mary Welsh

Order of British Columbia

 Peter Legge
 Andrew Weaver
 Kathy Shields
 Harold Peter Capozzi
 Mohini Singh 
 Arthur Freeman Vickers
 Kathy Louis
 Dr. Peter Ransford
 Kenneth William Daniel Shields
 Edward Harrison
 Dr. Kenneth Langelier
 Ann Mundigel Meraw
 Bruno Marti
 Dr. Charles Ludgate
 Gordon F. Gibson

Alberta Order of Excellence

Order of Prince Edward Island

Order of Manitoba

Order of New Brunswick

Order of Nova Scotia

Order of Newfoundland and Labrador

Military Valour Decorations

Star of Military Valour

 Major David Nelson Quick, S.M.V., C.D.
 Corporal James Ball, S.M.V. 
 Captain Jonathan Snyder, S.M.V. (deceased)
 Sergeant William Kenneth MacDonald, S.M.V., C.D.

Medal of Military Valour

 Sergeant Derek John Scott Fawcett, M.M.V, C.D.
 Private Shane Aaron Bradley Dolmovic, M.M.V.
 Corporal Dave Gionet, M.M.V. 
 Master Corporal Gerald Alexander Killam, M.M.V, C.D.
 Private Jay James Renaud, M.M.V.
 Corporal Michel Beaulieu, M.M.V.
 Captain Joseph Maurice Jocelyn Bordeleau, M.M.V, C.D. 
 Corporal Yan Dodier, M.M.V. 
 Master Corporal Érik Dubois, M.M.V. 
 Sergeant Stéphane Girard, M.M.V, C.D.
 Warrant Officer Joseph Yves Léon Gonneville, M.M.V, C.D. 
 Warrant Officer Joseph Jacques Stéphane Grenier, M.M.V, C.D. 
 Warrant Officer Joseph Mario Sylvain Isabelle, M.M.V, C.D.
 Major Michel Louis Lapointe, M.M.V., M.S.M., C.D.
 Corporal Edward R. G. Morley, M.M.V. 
 Corporal Erik Poelzer, M.M.V. 
 Captain Joseph Hughes Stéphane Tremblay, M.M.V, C.D.
 Corporal Cary Baker, M.M.V. 
 Corporal Steven Bancarz, M.M.V. 
 Captain Robert Peel, M.M.V, C.D.
 Major Joseph Antoine Dave Abboud, M.S.C., M.M.V, C.D. 
 Corporal Alexandre Benjamin Jonathan Dion, M.M.V.
 Master Corporal Christopher Lorne Harding, M.M.V.
 Warrant Officer Tod Hopkin, M.M.V, C.D.
 Corporal Bryce Keller, M.M.V. (Posthumous)

Canadian Bravery Decorations

Star of Courage

 RCMP Constable Timothy Dunlap
 Sergeant Paul David Phee
 RCMP Constable Guy Armand Raes
 James Alexander Santos

Medal of Bravery

 Lydia Angiyou
 Clint Antony Avery
 Constable Darren Wayne Barrington
 Constable Melbourne James Birmingham, M.B.* (This is a second award) 
 O.P.P. Constable Micheal Edmond Cholette
 Master Corporal Brian Michael Decaire
 Steven Murray Flynn
 Cherilyn Patricia Gill
 Constable Ryan George Hutchison
 Barry George Kessler
 Acting Sergeant Wayne MacDonald, M.B.* (This is a second award) 
 William Mann
 Vincent Lawrence Massey
 Alvaro Mejia
 Lisette Moar
 Robin Mole
 Theophillios Parusis
 Wayne Alton Russell
 Paul Anthony Skelton
 Sergeant Darcy J. L. J. St-Laurent, S.C., C.D.
 Paul Christopher Zakem
 Sony Anctil
 Stanley Anglin
 Petty Officer 1st class Alain Baillargeon, C.D. (deceased)
 Martin Baillargeon
 Constable Marco Barcarolo
 Marco Bédard
 Wesley Eugene Belland
 Allan Dale Bennett
 Constable Martin Bouchard
 Aaron Buffett
 Corporal Piotr Krzysztof Burcew
 Andrew Cartwright
 Edith Chamberland
 Richard K. Colbourne
 Philip Joseph Comeau
 Léonard Corbeil (posthumous)
 Constable Denis Côté
 Captain Jason Edward Demaine, C.D.
 Master-Corporal Jonas Denechezhe
 Constable Geneviève Descôteaux
 OPP Constable Dennis Armand Desjardins
 Constable Alain Ibrahim Diallo
 Sarto Duguay
 Constable Catherine Dumas
 Sergeant Carl Dussault
 Katayoun Eslah
 Brandon Fudge
 Harold Galliford
 Marc-Olivier Girard
 Mike Giroux
 David George Hamilton
 John Brendan Haney
 OPP Constable Walter Erik Howells
 Constable Henri-Louis Huot
 OPP Sergeant M. Adam W. Illman
 Aaron Alvin Karton
 Joseph Francis Kretschmer
 Stéphane Laplante
 Denis Lecuyer
 Richard Lemieux
 Lyne Lévesque
 John Lichtenwald 
 Captain Dennis Mann
 Corporal Adrian Roman Markowski
 Mark Timothy McKay
 John Andrew Mellon
 Edwin Norbert Merasty
 Hussam Mohamed Meshmesha (posthumous)
 Yves Morin
 Floyd D. Morris
 Vincent Pascale, C.D.
 Constable Shawn Charles Piercey
 Richard Plaisted
 Richard K. Randall
 OPP Constable (retired) Gary Read
 Joseph Eugene Stanley Rucchin
 Ronald Savill (deceased)
 Tommy Servant Lantin
 Mohamed Rashed Shaban
 Eric Patrick Shaffer
 Kevan Thomas Shaw
 Constable Catherine Simard
 Sarah Elizabeth Joy Smith
 Constable James John Sophocleous
 Alphonse St. Pierre
 Master Corporal Stephen Louis Thomas
 John Austin Thriepland
 Tina Lee Trombley
 Clifford Tssessaze
 OPP Constable Stephen Waite
 Ralph Edward Walker
 David Wheesk
 Norman Clyde Winsor
 Corey William Wood
 Sergeant Lawrence James Zimmerman

Meritorious Service Decorations

Meritorious Service Cross (Military Division)

 The Right Honourable Patricia Edwina Victoria Knatchbull, The 2nd Countess Mountbatten of Burma, C.B.E., M.S.C., C.D.
 Lieutenant-Colonel Simon Charles Hetherington, M.S.C., C.D.
 Lieutenant-Colonel Jean-Marc Lanthier, M.S.C., C.D.
 General Peter Pace, M.S.C., United States Marine Corps
 Master Warrant Officer William Alan Bolen, M.S.C., C.D.
 Chief Warrant Officer Robert Michel Joseph Girouard, M.S.C., C.D.
 General Lance L. Smith, M.S.C., United States Air Force
 Chief Warrant Officer Mark Leslie Baisley, M.S.C., C.D.
 Master Warrant Officer Wayne Alan Bartlett, M.S.C., C.D.
 Lieutenant-Colonel Wayne Donald Eyre, M.S.C., C.D.
 Warrant Officer Ian Long, M.S.C., C.D.
 Major Alexander Thomas Ruff, M.S.C., C.D.
 Lieutenant-Colonel Robert Daren Keith Walker, M.S.C., C.D.
 Brigadier-General Leslie Lawrence Fuller, M.S.C. (Retired), United States Army
 Lieutenant-Colonel Joseph Roger Alain Gauthier, M.S.C., C.D.
 Brigadier-General Joseph René Marcel Guy Laroche, O.M.M., M.S.C., C.D.
 Chief Warrant Officer Joseph Georges Jean Pierre Marchand, M.M.M., M.S.C., C.D. 
 Master Warrant Officer Joseph Christian Michel Mario Mercier, M.S.C., C.D. (Posthumous)
 Major Joseph Antoine Dave Abboud, M.S.C., M.M.V., C.D. 
 Lieutenant-Colonel Robert Keith Chamberlain, M.S.C., C.D.
 Colonel Nicolas Eldaoud, M.S.C., C.D.
 Major-General Timothy James Grant, O.M.M., M.S.C., C.D. 
 General Raymond Roland Joseph Henault, C.M.M., M.S.C., C.D. (Retired) 
 Lieutenant-Colonel Joseph Rosaire Aimé Stéphane Lafaut, M.S.C., C.D.
 Lieutenant-Colonel Paul Langlais, M.S.C., C.D. 
 Colonel Michael John Pearson, M.S.C., C.D.
 Major-General Walter Semianiw, O.M.M., M.S.C., C.D.
 Lieutenant-General Waldemar Skrzypczak, M.S.C.

Meritorious Service Medal (Military Division)

 Master Warrant Officer John Gerard Barnes, M.S.M., C.D.
 Chief Warrant Officer Stephen Stanley Bartlett, M.S.M., C.D.
 Major JM François Bisaillon, M.S.M., C.D.
 Lieutenant-Colonel Shane Anthony Brennan, M.S.M., C.D.
 Chief Warrant Officer Claude Caron, M.M.M., M.S.M., C.D.
 Lieutenant-Colonel John David Conrad, M.S.M., C.D.
 Major Mark Anthony Gasparotto, M.S.M. 
 Commander Darren Carl Hawco, M.S.M., C.D.
 Master-Corporal Lance Thomas Hooper, M.S.M., C.D.
 Major Gregory Wayne Ivey, M.S.M., C.D.
 Lieutenant-Colonel Colin Roy Keiver, M.S.M., C.D.
 Colonel Frederick A. Lewis, M.S.M., C.D.
 Major Andrew John Lussier, M.S.M., C.D.
 Captain Steven Kelly MacBeth, M.S.M., C.D.
 Master Warrant Officer Bradley William John Montgomery, M.S.M., C.D.
 Lieutenant-Colonel David Anthony Patterson, M.S.M., C.D.
 Captain Anthony Peter Robb, M.S.M.
 Corporal Jean-Paul Somerset, M.S.M. 
 Lieutenant-Colonel Barry Marshall Southern, M.S.M., C.D.
 Major Matthew Bruce Sprague, M.S.M., C.D.
 Major Michael Charles Wright, M.M.V., M.S.M., C.D.
 Colonel Peter Gerald Abbott, M.S.M., C.D.
 Commander Steven Albert Bell, M.S.M., C.D.
 Colonel Stephen Joseph Bowes, M.S.C., M.S.M., C.D.
 Major Richard William R. Goodyear, M.S.M., C.D.
 Sergeant Abdoul Amtou Guindo, M.S.M.
 Colonel Joseph Jean René Guy Hamel, M.S.M., C.D.
 Major Andrew John Lutes, M.S.M., C.D.
 Lieutenant-Colonel David Brian Berry, M.S.M., C.D.
 Warrant Officer Jules Joseph Jean Bérubé, M.S.M., C.D. 
 Major Thomas Bradley, M.S.M., C.D.
 Master Warrant Officer William John Crabb, M.S.M., C.D.
 Major Marc G. Diamond, M.S.M., C.D.
 Corporal Matthew John David Elliott, M.S.M. 
 Major Steven Geoffrey Graham, M.S.M., C.D.
 Warrant Officer Eric Richard Green, M.S.M., C.D.
 Warrant Officer James Adam Hunter, M.S.M., C.D.
 Master Warrant Officer Stephen Goward Jeans, M.S.M., C.D.
 Petty Officer First Class Paul Joseph Ernest Lavigne, M.S.M., C.D.
 Corporal Brett James Lovelace, M.S.M. 
 Commodore Paul Andrew Maddison, O.M.M., M.S.M., C.D. 
 Master Warrant Officer William Alan Richards, M.S.M., C.D.
 Commodore Joseph Alphonse Denis Rouleau, O.M.M., M.S.M., C.D.
 Corporal James Michael Ryan, M.S.M. 
 Colonel Richard Geoffrey St. John, M.S.M., C.D.
 Corporal Julie Marie Micheline Alain, M.S.M. 
 Chief Warrant Officer Gilles Arcand, M.M.M., M.S.M., C.D.
 Captain Dennie Bourque, M.S.M. 
 Colonel Andrew David Hawkesford Budd, M.S.M
 Corporal Pierre Brûlé Jr., M.S.M. 
 Captain Robert Colbourne, M.S.M., C.D.
 Major Steven Pierre Desjardins, M.S.M., C.D.
 Corporal Philippe Fortin, M.S.M. 
 Captain Frédérick Jean, M.S.M. 
 Major Michel Louis Lapointe, M.M.V., M.S.M., C.D.
 Major Patrick Henri Gérard Hubert Robichaud, M.S.M., C.D.
 Lieutenant-Colonel Joseph Jean-Pierre Bergeron, M.S.M., C.D.
 Corporal Patrick James Berrea, M.S.M., C.D. 
 Captain James Brennan, M.S.M., C.D.
 Master Corporal Christian Bureau, M.S.M. 
 Chief Petty Officer 1st Class Raymond Côté, M.S.M., C.D.
 Corporal Dominic Couture, M.S.M. 
 Master Warrant Officer Joseph Lucien André Demers, M.S.M., C.D.
 Master Corporal Steve Descarie, M.S.M., C.D.
 Master Corporal Danielle Dumas, M.S.M.
 Colonel Robert George (Geordie) Elms, M.S.M., C.D.
 Honorary Colonel Blake Charles Goldring, M.S.M. 
 Major Pierre Huet, M.S.M., C.D.
 Colonel J. C. G. Juneau, M.S.M., C.D.
 Major Russell Joseph King, M.S.M., C.D.
 Lieutenant-Colonel Douglas Marvin Labrie, M.S.M., C.D.
 Chief Warrant Officer Michel Landry, M.S.M., C.D.
 Honorary Colonel Douglas Gordon Marr, M.S.M., C.D. (retired) 
 Lieutenant-Colonel Michael Charles Maurer, M.S.M., C.D.
 Major James Duncan Mckillip, M.S.M.∗, C.D. 
 Lieutenant-Colonel Christian Mercier, M.S.M., C.D.
 Major Richard Moffet, M.S.M., C.D.
 Master Warrant Officer André Moreau, M.S.M., C.D.
 Master Warrant Officer Sylvain Parent, M.S.M., C.D.
 Colonel Thomas Seay, M.S.M. of the United States of America
 Lieutenant Marc-Antoine Sigouin, M.S.M. 
 Major Peter Richard Sullivan, M.S.M., C.D. (retired) 
 Colonel Luther (Trey) S. Turner III, M.S.M. of the United States Air Force
 Commander Stephen Alexander Virgin, M.S.M., C.D.

Mentions in Dispatches
 
 Private John Matt Andersen
 Captain Isabelle Marie-Ève Bégin
 Sergeant Jos Jean Éric Bergeron
 Corporal Philippe Berthiaume
 Master Corporal Marie Sylvie Annie Bilodeau
 Private David Blier
 Corporal Guillaume Boulay
 Private Michael Charlish
 Warrant Officer Robert Joseph Clarke, C.D.
 Captain Robert Colbourne, C.D.
 Master Corporal Russell Wayne Coughlin
 Leading Seaman Bruce Michael Crews
 Warrant Officer Joseph Lois Henri Dany De Chantal, C.D.
 Corporal Daniel Joseph Dulong, C.D.
 Master Corporal Shain Roy Dusenbury
 Corporal Jean-François Filion
 Master Corporal Timothy Wayne Fletcher, C.D.
 Master Corporal Joseph Daniel François Flibotte
 Sergeant Michael Girard, C.D.
 Warrant Officer Guevens Guimont, C.D.
 Captain Jonathan Hewson Hamilton
 Corporal Christopher Henderson
 Warrant Officer Darren John Hessell, C.D.
 Corporal Jason Hoekstra
 Sergeant Vaughan Ingram (Posthumous)
 Captain Ryan Edward Jurkowski, C.D.
 Corporal Stephen James Myers Keeble, C.D.
 Warrant Officer André Lamarre, C.D.
 Captain Marc-André Langelier
 Sergeant David L’Heureux, C.D.
 Captain Mark James Lubiniecki
 Corporal Nicolae Toma Lupu
 Private Michael Richard Stephen MacWhirter
 Captain Blair McNaught
 Master Corporal Christopher Michael Mistzal
 Captain Joseph Julien Daniel Morin
 Master Corporal Matthew Parsons
 Corporal Benjamin Joel Peach
 Captain Trevor Joseph Pellerine, C.D. 
 Master Corporal Cécil David Plamondon
 Master Corporal Daryl Edward Presley
 Master Corporal Tracy Wavell Price
 Corporal Christopher Jonathan Reid (Posthumous)
 Lieutenant Benjamin Richard
 Major Robert Tennant Ritchie, C.D.
 Captain Danis Rouleau, C.D.
 Warrant Officer Joseph André Daniel Royer, C.D.
 Major Harjit Sajjan, C.D.
 Sergeant Scott Lee Schall, C.D.
 Captain Mark Andrew Sheppard
 Private Alex Shulaev
 Master Corporal Kelly Godfrey Smith
 Master Corporal Mark William Soper
 Private Randy Lee Volpatti
 Captain Michael Craig Volstad, C.D.
 Master Corporal Jeffrey Walsh
 Corporal Jonathan Francis Williams
 Master Corporal Christopher William John Woodhouse

Commonwealth and Foreign Orders, Decorations and Medal awarded to Canadians

From Her Majesty The Queen in Right of the United Kingdom

Operational Service Medal (Afghanistan)
 Major I.W. McLean 
 Major Steven William Riff
 Captain M. Turgeon
 Captain M. Walker
 Major Paul Gautron

Operational Service Medal (Iraq)
 Lieutenant J. Vallis

From the President of Austria

Decoration of Honour in Silver
 Ms. Gertrude Duller

From His Majesty The King of the Belgians

Grand Cross of the Order of the Crown
 General Raymond Henault

Commander of the Order of the Crown
 Mr. Jean-Pierre Kesteman

From the President of the French Republic

National Order of the Legion of Honour

Grand Cross
 Mr. Paul Desmarais

Commander
 The Honourable Jean Charest, PC, MNA

Officer
 Mrs. Lise Bissonnette
 Mr. Max “One Onti” Gros-Louis
 Mr. Michel Bissonnet

Knight
 Mrs. Diane Dufresne
 Mr. Michel Tremblay
 Mrs. Fatima Houda-Pépin

National Order of Merit

Officer
 Mr. Henri Grondin

Knight of the National Order of Merit
 Mrs. Suzanne Moffet
 Mrs. Marie-Claire Blais
 Mrs. Louise Cordeau
 Mrs. Suzanne Gouin
 Mr. Jacques Lacoursière
 Mrs. Francine Lelièvre
 Mr. Claude Lizé
 Mr. Alfred Pilon

Order of Arts and Letters

Commander of the Order of Arts and Letters
 Mr. Pierre Théberge

Officer of the Order of Arts and Letters
 Mr. Conrad Ouellon

Knight of the Order of Arts and Letters
 Mrs. Gisèle Delage
 Mrs. Claudette Fortier
 Mr. Guy Latraverse
 Mr. Gérald Paquette
 Mr. Gilles Pellerin
 Mr. Peter Boneham
 Mr. Daniel Poliquin

Knight of the Order of Agricultural Merit

 Mr. Yannick Folgoas
 Mr. Todd Halpern
 Mr. Fatos Pristine
 Mr. Jean-Guy Saint-Amand

Knight of the Order of Maritime Merit

 Mr. John Butler

Order of the Academic Palms

Officer
 Mr. Marc Arnal

Knight
 Mrs. Noella Arsenault-Cameron
 Mr. Paul Ceurstemont
 Mr. Peter John Edwards
 Mr. Jacques Frémont
 Mrs. Yolande Grisé
 Mr. Armand Saintonge

National Defence Medals

National Defence Medal, Gold Echelon with Clasp « Gendarmerie nationale » 
 Associate Commissioner of the RCMP Walter Gérald Lynch

National Defence Medal, Silver Echelon with Clasp Land Forces
 Major Doris Gobeil

National Defence Medal, Silver Echelon with Clasps Land Force and exterior assistant mission 
 Lieutenant-Colonel Jean-Claude Gagnon

From the President of the Federal Republic of Germany

Cross of the Order of Merit
 Mr. Graham Ford

From the Government of Hungary

Commander's Cross of the Order of Merit
 Mr. Béla Balázs

Knight's Cross of the Order of Merit
 Mrs. Éva Kossuth
 Rev. Leslie Laszlo
 Mrs. Mária Maíláth

From the President of Italy

Grand Officer of the Order of Merit
 Professor David N. Weisstub

Commander of the Order of Merit
 Mr. Emilio Panarella

Knight of the Order of Merit
 Mrs. Marianna Simeone

Grand Officier of the Order of the Star of Solidarity
 Mr. Christopher Alexander

Commander of the Order of the Star of Solidarity
 Mr. Salvatore Giovanni Ciccolini, C.M., O.Ont.
 Mr. Joseph Sorbara

Knight of the Order of the Star of Solidarity
 Mrs. Marie Chiarelli La Chimea
 Mr. Nicola Marrone 
 Mr. Gilberto Baruzzo
 Mr. Luigi Cucchi
 Mr. Geller Garbagni
 Ms. Valeria Sestrieri Lee
 Mr. Raffaele Ercolano
 Mr. Lorenzo Michele Di Donato
 Mr. Fortunato Rao
 Mr. Giuseppe Paventi
 Mr. Vinci Biagio

From His Majesty The King of the Hashemite Kingdom of Jordan

Jordan International Police Training Centre Medal
The Chancellery of Honours is the custodian of the register of recipients of the medal

From His Majesty the King of Lesotho

Knight Commander of the Most Dignified Order of Moshoeshoe
 Mr. Stephen Lewis, CC

From His Royal Highness The Grand Duke of Luxembourg

Commander of the Oak Crown
 Mr. David Chestley Netterville

Commander of the Order of Merit
 Mr. David Cook

From Her Majesty The Queen of the Netherlands

Commander of the Order of Orange-Nassau
 General Rick J. Hillier

From the President of Nigeria

Member of the Order of the Federal Republic
 Mr. Vincent Del Buono

From the Secretary General of the North Atlantic Treaty Organisation

NATO Meritorious Service Medal
 Colonel Charles W. Attwood
 Mr. Jim Cargill
 Lieutenant-Colonel Marc Gendron
 Mr. Rohan Maxwell
 Major Peter Sullivan
 Lieutenant-General Angus Watt

From His Majesty The King of Norway

Order of Merit
 Dr. Christopher Hale
 Mr. Stein Gudmûndseth
 Mr. Eiving Hoff
 Mr. Robert Ian Collingwood
 Mr. Claude Page
 Mr. Richard W. Pound

From the President of Poland

Commander's Cross of the Order of Merit
 Major-General Reginald W. Lewis, C.M., C.M.M., C.D. (see Erratums) 
 Mr. Bernd Goetze (see Erratums)

Officer's Cross of the Order of Merit
 Ms. Hannah Weinberg

Knight of the Order of the Cross of Merit
 Mrs. Maria Kaszuba
 Mr. Bernd Goetze (see Erratums) 
 Mrs. Janina Maria Bolaszewska
 Mrs. Irena Maria Domecka
 Mrs. Jadwiga Janina Keats
 Mr. Stanislaw Leon Lis
 Mrs. Zofia Wawryniuk
 Mr. Walter Paszkowski
 Mrs. Maria Zielinska

Gold Cross of Merit
 Mrs. Malgorzata Boczkowska
 Mr. Aleksander Bozek
 Mrs. Elzbieta Gazda
 Mr. Stanislaw Glogowski
 Mrs. Halina Róznawska
 Mr. Zdzislaw Róznawski
 Mr. Ignacy Góral
 Mr. Jan Cymerman
 Mrs. Janina Kokociński
 Mr. Wladyslaw Kowal
 Mr. Antoni Kowal
 Mrs. Józefina Paweska
 Mrs. Maria Teresa Warnke
 Mr. Robert Zenon Żawierucha

Silver Cross of Merit
 Mr. Kazimierz Domanowski
 Mr. Janusz Drzymala
 Mr. Tadeusz Maziarz
 Mr. Zbigniew Mielczarek
 Mrs. Danuta Wronowski
 Mrs. Teresa Szramek

From His Majesty The King of Spain

The Cross of the Order of Civil Merit
 Dr. Patrick Barnabé
 Mr. Louis Holmes
 Mr. Marino Simioni

From the President of Ukraine

Order of Merit 3rd Class
 Mr. Andrew Hladyshevsky
 Mr. Peter Kule
 Dr. Bohdan Medwidsky
 Mr. Bohdan Onyschuk
 Dr. Peter Potichnyj
 Mr. Yaroslav Sokolyk

Order of Princess Olha 3rd Class
 Ms. Marsha Skrypuch
 Ms. Ruslana Wrzesnewskyj
 Ms. Zenia Kushpeta

Noble Work and Virtue
 Ms. Julia Krekhovetsky
 Ms. Marianne Lenchak Grosse
 Mr. Ivan Mazurenko
 Mr. Stefan Petelycky
 Ms. Emilia Stelmach

Order of Kniaz (King) Yaroslav The Wise, 5th Class
 The Honourable Raynell Andreychuk

From the President of United States of America

Officer of the Legion of Merit
 Brigadier-General Daniel J. Pépin
 Colonel Richard J. Giguère

Bronze Star Medal
 Colonel Robert Shaw

Meritorious Service Medal
 Major Daniel G. Daly
 Colonel Wade L. Hoddinott
 Lieutenant-Colonel Lawrence J. Zaporzan
 Petty Officer 2nd Class Jean Allard
 Warrant Officer Stephan Watters
 Lieutenant-Colonel William F. Schultz
 Chief Warrant Officer Derek J. W. Bisson
 Lieutenant-Colonel Stephen J. Delaney
 Major-General Peter J. Devlin
 Chief Warrant Officer Kenneth G. Hodge
 Major Robin F. Holman
 Lieutenant-Colonel Robert Kearney
 Lieutenant-Commander Craig J. McLay
 Major Yvonne K. Pratt
 Master Warrant Officer Gary M. Pullen
 Major David A. Quinn
 Lieutenant-Commander Troy D. White

Air Medal
 Captain Marc J. Delisle
 Captain Garry R. Wheaton

Air Medal and Air Medal (First Oak Leaf Cluster) 
 Major Arthur J. Henry

Air Medal and Air Medal (First, Second, Third Oak Leaf Cluster)
 Major Henrik N. Smith

Erratums of Commonwealth and Foreign Orders, Decorations and Medal awarded to Canadians

Correction of 28 June 2008
 The notice published on page 181 of the 26 January 2008 issue of the Canada Gazette, Part I, is hereby amended as follows: From the President of Poland, the Kinght's Cross of the Order of Merit to Mr. Bernd Goetze.

Corrections of 08 November 2008
 The notice published on page 1944 of the 28 June 2008 issue of the Canada Gazette, Part I, is hereby amended as follows: From the President of Poland, Commander's Cross of the Order of Merit to Major-General Reginald W. Lewis.
 The notice published on page 2494 of the 30 August 2008 issue of the Canada Gazette, Part I, is hereby amended as follows: From Her Majesty The Queen in Right of the United Kingdom, the Operational Service Medal (Afghanistan) to Major Paul Gautron.

References 

Monarchy in Canada
2008 in Canada